Miss Earth Venezuela is an annual beauty pageant in Venezuela. The winner of Miss Earth Venezuela obtains the right to represent the country in the Miss Earth pageant, an annual international major beauty pageant that advocates for environmental awareness, conservation, and social responsibility.

The reigning Miss Earth Venezuela are María Daniela Velasco from the Capital District (for Miss Earth 2021), and Oriana Pablos also from the Capital District (for Miss Earth 2022).

History

2001-2015: Sambil Model and Miss Venezuela
Miss Earth Venezuela title was first given by Sambil Model Organization. Sambil Model produced titleholders like Alexandra Braun and Jessica Barboza. From 2010 to 2015 Miss Earth Venezuela was chosen by the beauty czar Osmel Sousa. In 2010, Miss Venezuela Organization acquired the franchise for Miss Earth Venezuela and the organization declared that Miss Earth, along with Miss Universe and Miss World contests, is one of the three largest beauty pageants in the world in terms of the number of participating countries. The organization conducted a selection process which attended by several former beauty queens and runners up to qualify for participation. Mariángela Bonanni  who competed in the Miss Venezuela 2009 (placed as first runner up) representing the state of Táchira, was chosen by the organization to participate in Miss Earth 2010 and she placed in Top 7.

2016 - present: Organizacion Miss Earth Venezuela and Globovision

Miss Earth Venezuela, based in Caracas, is organized by Miss Earth Venezuela National Directors Julio César Cruz and Alyz Henrich. The pageant was established to elect Venezuela's representative in the annual Miss Earth and to promote environmental awareness and protection of the earth.

Stephanie de Zorzi was appointed Miss Earth Venezuela 2016 in a small ceremony where she was crowned the second time by Alyz Henrich for the new Miss Earth Venezuela Organization. She represented Venezuela at Miss Earth 2016 pageant held in Manila, Philippines where she became an instant sensation and generated an instant large number of followers. Stephanie easily got numerous supporters in the Philippines not only in her home country including the Latin community in Western Hemisphere. She competed with 82 other delegates from around the world. During the pre-pageant events, Stephanie was able to get a silver medal during the press presentation as part of the "Darling of the Press" award.

At 2017 to 2018, Venezuela managed to snatch one of the Top 8 slots during the Miss Earth pageant finals which was both held in the Philippines. However, in 2019, Venezuela failed to place for the first time after its 14-year-long streak of placements.

2020-2021: Covid 19 Implications

In 2020, Miss Earth Venezuela Organization, appointed Miss Earth Venezuela - Fire 2019 Stephany Zreik as Miss Earth Venezuela 2020. This was followed after Miss Earth Organization disclosed publicly that the pageant would hold a virtual pageant, as a response to the impact of the Covid-19 pandemic. During the Miss Earth 2020 pageant, Stephany Zreik got got the Miss Earth - Air title, making history as the said country can now complete all the elemental titles offered by the Miss Earth pageant.

In 2021, after a selection process of several weeks in which Instagram followers were involved, Gasiba was chosen as one of the 5 finalists. Within this group were also foundː

Gabriela de la Cruz, Miss Supranational Venezuela 2019 and fourth finalist of Miss Supranational 2019.
 Lisandra Chirinos, Miss Portuguesa 2020 and Top 10 of Miss Venezuela 2020.
 María Daniela Velasco, Miss Earth Capital District 2017, Top 7 of Miss Earth Venezuela 2017 and Top 10 of Miss Continents United 2017.
 Valentina Sánchez, Miss Nueva Esparta 2020, Top 5 of Miss Venezuela 2020 and third finalist of Miss Supranational 2021.

On October 11, 2021, this group was reduced to 3 finalistsː Lisandra Chirinos, Elizabeth Gasiba and María Daniela Velasco.

On October 15, 2021, the designation event was held, in which Gasiba and Velasco would finally be tied. In this event, a group of juries was in charge of evaluating the remaining candidates in a round of questions. Among those who were:

 Edgar Rosales, Executive Vice President of Banco Plaza.
 Dr. Thomas Seif, dentist.
 Vanessa Torres, director of Velvet The Beauty House.
 Teresa Pérez, business manager of Erika's Cosmetic.
 Juan José Álvarez, director of Unilever Andina (Sedal).
 Dias Khadijah Kinanthi, Indonesian Consul in Venezuela.
 Jholeidys Silva, president of Velvet The Beauty House.
 Otayma Zerpa, President of Otayma Zerpa Designs.
 Eleazar Guzmán, physical trainer at Lido Fitness.
 Giselle Reyes, runway teacher.
 Johan Changó, official photographer of Miss Earth Venezuela 2021.
 Guillermo Felizola, official photographer of Miss Earth Venezuela 2021.
 Faddya Halabi, model and businesswoman.

In this designation ceremony, both were put to the test in a varied round of questions.

At the end of the event, the president of the Miss Earth Venezuela Organization, Prince Julio César, declared that both María Daniela Velasco and Elizabeth Gasiba would both be bearers of the title of Miss Earth Venezuela, Velasco as Miss Earth Venezuela 2021, and Gasiba as Miss Earth Venezuela 2022. Finally, Gasiba was titled as Miss Earth Venezuela 2022; the band and the crown were imposed by Maribel Pombo, Globovisión's vice president of sales and marketing, and by Osvaldo Montañes, general producer of Miss Earth Venezuela.

Titleholders 
The following women have been crowned Miss Earth Venezuela:

Winners

Elemental Titleholders

Venezuelan Representatives to Miss Earth
Since 2016, Miss Earth Venezuela is chosen by Alyz Henrich, Miss Earth 2013 and Julio César Cruz, the National Directors of Miss Earth Venezuela pageant. Prior to 2016, the 2nd or 3rd runner up from the Miss Venezuela pageant would represent Venezuela at Miss Earth the last representative sent by the Miss Venezuela Organization was in 2015
Color Key
Color keys

Gallery of Miss Earth Venezuela

See also 
 Miss Venezuela
 Big Four international beauty pageants

References

External links

Miss Venezuela Earth Official Website in Instagram

 
Venezuela
Venezuela
Beauty pageants in Venezuela
Venezuelan awards